Ram Krishna Sinha  (1 September 1920 – 24 August 1984) was an Indian freedom fighter, politician and Member of Parliament of India. He was a member of the 4th and the 5th Lok Sabhas of India. Sinha represented the Faizabad constituency of Uttar Pradesh and was a member of the Congress political party.

Early life and education
Sinha was born in Faizabad in the state of Uttar Pradesh. He attended Lucknow University where he attained LL.B followed by MSc degrees. Sinha worked as an advocate prior to joining Indian independence movement and politics. Sinha got married in 1949.

Political career

Pre-independence
Sinha participated in the Indian independence movement. He got involved with the Quit India Movement in 1930s and was imprisoned twice between 1938 and 1942. After his release and between 1942 and 1944, Sinha was detained in Faizabad and Lucknow jails. After getting released from detention, he had to remain underground till 1945. In 1945, Sinha assumed the post of President, UP Student's Congress and entered active politics.

Post independence
Sinha entered active politics in early 1930s. He joined Congress party but soon moved to Socialist Party (India) followed by Congress Socialist Party. By 1951, Sinha was back with Congress party. He held several key party and parliamentary positions in the coming years. Sinha was Member of Parliament, twice from the same constituency.

Sinha convened several conferences; viz "Northern India Freedom Fighters Conference", "National Conference on Freedom Fighters", "Socialism", "Democracy", "Non-alignment and National Integration" etc.

Posts held

See also

4th & 5th Lok Sabha
Lok Sabha
Politics of India
Parliament of India
Government of India
Indian National Congress
Faizabad (Lok Sabha constituency)
List of Indian independence activists

References 

1920 births
1984 deaths
India MPs 1967–1970
India MPs 1971–1977
Indian National Congress politicians from Uttar Pradesh
Lok Sabha members from Uttar Pradesh
People from Faizabad
People from Faizabad district
Indian independence activists from Uttar Pradesh